Hout is a surname.

It may also refer to:
 Hout, Syria, a village
 Hout River, Limpopo Province, South Africa
 Alkmaarderhout, a former multi-purpose stadium in Alkmaar, Netherlands, known as the "Hout"

See also
 Houts, another surname